The Borneo montane rain forests is an ecoregion on the island  of Borneo in Southeast Asia. It includes montane tropical and subtropical moist broadleaf forests, also known as a cloud forests. The ecoregion is partly in East Malaysia (Sabah and Sarawak states) and Indonesia (Kalimantan).

Location and description
This ecoregion consists of tropical mountain cloud forest and laurel forest above 1000 meters elevation in the mountains in the centre of Borneo. It covers portions of all three countries – Brunei, Malaysia, and Indonesia – which divide Borneo. These cooler and moister slopes rise above the carpet of thick rainforest that covers the warmer lowlands below, and as well as additional rainfall also derive moisture from low clouds. Soils are poorer and more acidic than the lowlands.

Flora
The isolated higher and cooler forests of the island are home to a rich and distinctive set of plants of both Asian and Australasian origin. There are especially large numbers of Nepenthes pitcher plants (>15 species), rhododendrons, and orchids.

Montane forests typically have a closed canopy with single stratum, and the canopy height generally decreases with elevation. Typical trees include species of the plant families Fagaceae and Lauraceae, with conifers increasingly abundant at higher elevations. The lower montane forests have a high diversity of orchid and fern species. Carnivorous plants, including species of Nepenthes, Drosera, and Utricularia, are most abundant in areas with high rainfall and a stunted, open tree canopy. The montane forests are interspersed with areas of graminoid scrub, generally associated with hypermagnesic cambisol soils.

This ecoregion also contains important areas of forest on limestone upland, especially Mount Api which has clear elevational zones of differing vegetation. Long Pasia in the Meligan Range and the Usun Apau Plateau have important areas of high-elevation wetland.

The ultramafic rocks which make up portions of the Crocker Range and Mount Kinabalu create soils rich in certain metallic elements (nickel, cobalt, chromium, and manganese), high cation imbalances (high Mg:Ca molar quotients), and deficiencies of some nutrients including potassium and phosphorus. These soil conditions affect the plant life, and plant communities on ultramafic soils show lower stature and lower biomass, higher levels of endemism, and a distinct species composition compared to typical montane plant commmunities at similar elevations.

Fauna
The montane rain forests are home to a distinct fauna, including large numbers of mammals such as civets (such as the rare Hose's civet Diplogale hosei, endemic to these montane forests), tree shrews, squirrels, and rats and primates such as orangutan (Pongo pygmaeus), gibbons, and langurs. Although most of these primates prefer lower elevations there are especially good numbers of the large macaque monkeys and as the forests are less-disturbed at higher elevations larger animals such as orangutans and Sumatran rhinoceros (Dicerorhinus sumatrensis) have retreated here from the lowlands.

Although there are fewer birds in the Bornean mountains than in the lowlands there is a higher proportion of endemic species, indeed most of Borneo's unique birds live in the montane forests e.g. on Mount Mulu in Sarawak there are 171 different birds in the lowlands and only 12 species at 1300m. Endemic and near-endemic bird species include the crimson-headed partridge (Haematortyx sanguiniceps), fruithunter (Chlamydochaera jefferyi), pygmy white-eye (Heleia squamifrons), Rajah scops owl (Otus brookii), Kinabalu serpent eagle (Spilornis kinabaluensis), Whitehead's trogon (Harpactes whiteheadi), Bornean barbet (Psilopogon eximius), golden-naped barbet (Psilopogon pulcherrimus), Whitehead's spiderhunter (Arachnothera juliae), Hose's broadbill (Calyptomena hosii), Whitehead's broadbill (Calyptomena whiteheadi), black-sided flowerpecker (Dicaeum monticolum), black oriole (Oriolus hosii), Bornean whistler (Pachycephala hypoxantha) friendly bush warbler (Locustella accentor), eyebrowed jungle flycatcher (Vauriella gularis), blue-wattled bulbul (Pycnonotus nieuwenhuisii), Bornean stubtail (Urosphena whiteheadi), bare-headed babbler (Melanocichla calva), chestnut-crested yuhina (Staphida everetti), mountain wren-babbler (Gypsophila crassa), Sunda laughingthrush (Garrulax palliatus), Everett's thrush (Zoothera everetti), black-capped white-eye (Zosterops atricapilla), and mountain blackeye (Zosterops emiliae).

Threats and preservation
The higher elevations of Borneo are relatively inaccessible, and subject to less logging and conversion to agriculture than the lowland rain forests. The montane forests were less affected by the forest fires of 1997-8 that damaged so much of Borneo's lowland forest. Approximately three-quarters of the montane forests are still relatively intact. 23.11% of the ecoregion is in protected areas. Protected areas include a very large block in Kayan Mentarang National Park, which is home to communities of indigenous people but is threatened by commercial logging and road building. This park and others such as Betung Kerihun National Park are important refuges for wildlife as lowland habitats are being systematically removed. Protected areas include:
 Gunung Mulu National Park
 Kayan Mentarang National Park
 Betung Kerihun National Park
 Pulong Tau National Park
 Usun Apau National Park
 Ulu Temburong National Park
 Bukit Baka Bukit Raya National Park
 Gunung Buda National Park
 Kalamuku National Park
 Bald Hill Forest Reserve
 Mt. Andrassy Forest Reserve
 Quoin Hill Forest Reserve
 Ulu Kalumpang Forest Reserve
 Maliau Basin Forest Reserve and buffer zones
 Gunong Lumaku Forest Reserve
 Basio Forest Reserve
 Maligan Forest Reserve
 Sungai Sansiang Forest Reserve
 Agathis Forest Reserve
 Danum Valley Forest Reserve
 Sungai Serudong Forest Reserve
 Sungai Siliawan & Sungai Siliawan (Extension) Forest Reserve
 Gunung Lumaku Forest Reserve
 Gunung Kumaka Forest Reserve
 Gunung Rara Wildlife Corridor Forest Reserve
 Kungkular Forest Reserve
 Mengilan Forest Reserve
 Mount Louisa Forest Reserve
 Nurod Urod Forest Reserve
 Pensiangan Forest Reserve
 Silimpopon Forest Reserve
 Sipitang Forest Reserve
 Sungai Anjeranjermut Forest Reserve
 Sungai Katambalang Forest Reserve
 Sungai Sumagas Forest Reserve
 Sungai Tiagau Forest Reserve
 Tajong Forest Reserve
 Tambulanan Forest Reserve
 Ulu Segama Forest Reserve

See also
Heart of Borneo

References

 
Borneo
Ecoregions of Asia
Ecoregions of Brunei
Ecoregions of Indonesia
Ecoregions of Malaysia
Ecoregions of Malesia

Indomalayan ecoregions
Montane forests
Natural history of Brunei
Tropical and subtropical moist broadleaf forests
Tropical rainforests of Indonesia